The Agent Intellect is the third studio album by Detroit post-punk band Protomartyr, released on 9 October 2015. The first single from the album, "Why Does It Shake" was released on 14 July 2015, along with the formal announcement of the album's title, release date, cover art and track listing. On 25 August the band released the second single for the album, "Dope Cloud". on 28 September the band released the third single for the album, "I Forgive You". On September 28, 2015 the album debuted on NPR First Listen.

The album is named after an ancient medieval philosophical questioning of how the mind operates in relation to the so-called active intellect, also known as agent intellect and other names.

Release

Critical reception
The Agent Intellect was met with positive reviews from contemporary reviewers. At Metacritic, which assigns a normalized rating out of 100 to reviews from mainstream critics, the album received an average score of 85, which indicates "Universal acclaim", based on 20 reviews. The Guardian critic Kate Hutchinson thought: "This isn’t spiky postpunk like their last album – it’s more unhinged: they’ve swapped hooks for a dirgy epicness, distortion bulldozes through, sometimes flaring angrily, punctured by driving, truly affecting drums. As poignant as those images of a decrepit Motor City, once brilliant, now decayed." Sam Lefebvre of Paste magazine described the album as "an album of spindly bass, needling guitar and economical drums." Lefebvre further added "And yet, with Protomartyr’s inventive ensemble flare, it sounds like much more."

Kyle Ryan of The A.V. Club thought that: "The Agent Intellect is an impressive addition to the band’s small discography, and it hints that bigger, bolder work may lay ahead.". AllMusic thought that: "Protomartyr's music is smart without wearing its intellect on its sleeve, and physically strong enough to support the ideas lurking behind Casey's lyrics, and The Agent Intellect is an album that challenges both the mind and the body; if you're looking for further confirmation that Protomartyr are one of the smartest and toughest bands of their day, this album is what you need.". In a review for Rolling Stone, Zach Kelly thought that: this LP feels like a testament to perseverance, with world-weary humor and introspection providing flashes of clarity".

Accolades & covers 
Pitchfork and Pretty Much Amazing ranked the track "Dope Cloud" the 98th and 89th best track of 2015 respectively. Thrillist included it on their list "The 25 Most 'Detroit' Songs Ever Recorded".

Oliver Ackermann of A Place to Bury Strangers included The Agent Intellect among his favorite albums of the year, calling it a "[f]ucking wicked record." In 2017, David Bazan of Pedro The Lion fame covered "The Devil in His Youth" for the anti-Trump compilation Our First 100 Days. Preoccupations covered the track "Pontiac 87" as the b-side of a split single with Protomartyr in 2018.

Year-end

Miscellaneous

Usage in media
The song "Cowards Starve" has been used in the third episode of 13 Reasons Why's first season.

Track listing

Personnel 
 Bass Guitar – Scott Davidson
 Drums – Alex Leonard
 Guitar, Keyboards – Greg Ahee
 Vocals – Joe Casey
 Writing ["All Songs By"] – Protomartyr

Additional credits
 Mastering – Sarah Register
 Recording, Mixing – Bill Skibbe
 Recording ["Additional"] – Derek Stanton
 Vocals ["Additional"] – Dina Bankole, Jenny Junior

Charts

References

2015 albums
Protomartyr (band) albums
Hardly Art albums